John Gordon (born 27 June 1985) is an English actor. He is best known for roles such as Sean in Elaine Constantine's Northern Soul (film), Ronnie Biggs in the BBC One tv-series The Great Train Robbery (2013 TV series) and Peter Foley in BBC The Crimson Field. On the stage, he gained acclaim for his role as "man" in Philip Ridley's Tender Napalm and Giovanni in Cheek by Jowl's 'Tis Pity She's a Whore.

Early life
Jack Gordon was born on 27 June 1985 in Bedfordshire, England. After graduating from Bedford College, he became a member of the National Youth Theatre. At seventeen, he was accepted at the Royal Academy of Dramatic Art and graduated with a BA in Dramatic Arts in 2007. During his final year, he signed with talent agency Hamilton Hodell.

Career
Following RADA, he starred as Romeo in Shakespeare's Romeo and Juliet at the Battersea Arts Centre in London. On stage, he played Billy in West End show Warhorse at the National Theatre in 2010. In 2011, he resumed work with Phillip Ridley who cast him to star as 'Man' in his play, Tender Napalm. The following year, he starred as Giovanni in 'Tis Pity She's A Whore, a Cheek by Jowl production that would go on to tour the world.

In film, he would go on to play roles such as Jamie in Andrea Arnold's Fish Tank, Jeeko in Phillip Ridley’s Heartless, Lieutenant Burridge in Julian Jarrold’s A Royal Night Out and GI Stanley in Captain America; The First Avenger. In 2014 he was cast as the rowdy Northern Soul dancer, Sean in Elaine Constantine’s Northern Soul, and starred as Max in Love Me Do opposite Rebecca Calder in 2015.

His television work includes the award-winning The Great Train Robbery, directed by Julian Jarrold, where he played the role of notorious thief, Ronnie Biggs, as well as various projects on the BBC, including The Crimson Field where he played Orderly Corporal Peter Foley, as well EastEnders, Primeval, and The Bill.

In 2017, he reunited with director Anthony Woodley for the role of Russell in the up-and-coming refugee-drama, The Flood, starring Lena Headey.

Filmography

Film

Television

Stage
2018
| ‘’ Henry V ‘’
| Henry 
| Corsini Gardens, Florence 
| The New Generation Festival

Short Film

References

External links

http://www.hamiltonhodell.co.uk/talent/jack-gordon/

English male actors
1985 births
Living people